Martin Basiri is an Iranian-born technology entrepreneur, who is the co-founder and CEO of ApplyBoard, an international student Edtech platform based in Kitchener, Ontario, Canada.

Early life 
Basiri was born in 1988 in Iran. He is the oldest child in the family with two twin brothers, Meti and Massi, and a younger sister. Basiri had an early interest in building things at an early age and also in entrepreneurship building programs and tools that would continue into his undergraduate career where he built and sold six different products and patents.

He would go on to earn a bachelor's degree in Electrical and Electronics Engineering from Shiraz University in his native Iran in 2010. He then, as an international student, traveled to Canada to attend the University of Waterloo to eventually earn a Master's in Mechanical and Mechatronics Engineering in 2013.

Basiri would go on to help his younger twin brothers, Meti and Massi, go through the international student application process to Canada where they would go on to attend Conestoga College in Kitchener, Ontario. The challenges they faced during this process reportedly was the impetus for the creation of their company ApplyBoard.

Career 
Basiri worked as an engineer in the United States following the completion of his master's degree from the University of Waterloo. He returned to Canada in 2014 to work with his brothers on developing what would become ApplyBoard.

ApplyBoard launched on May 5, 2015, in Waterloo, Ontario as an international student search and application platform with Martin serving as co-founder and CEO. Martin's connection to the University of Waterloo spurred on their acceptance into the Velocity incubator program.

Basiri has led ApplyBoard through a number of funding rounds, most notably becoming a "unicorn" in 2020 after being valued at over $1 billion after their Series C, and again in June 2021 during their Series D which put the startup's value at more than $4 billion CDN.

Awards 
Basiri was awarded the 2019 Young Alumni Achievement Medal from the University of Waterloo. He was also named a 2021 Regional Finalist in EY’s annual Entrepreneur of the Year program.

References 

1988 births
Living people
Iranian chief executives
Canadian chief executives
Businesspeople from Kitchener, Ontario
Company founders
Shiraz University alumni
University of Waterloo alumni